The men's 200 metre individual medley SM8 event at the 2014 Commonwealth Games as part of the swimming programme took place on 28 July at the Tollcross International Swimming Centre in Glasgow, Scotland.

The medals were presented by Anne Ellis, President of the Commonwealth Games Council for Wales and the quaichs were presented by Prof. Leigh Robinson, Director of Corporate Governance and Compliance, Commonwealth Games Scotland.

Records
Prior to this competition, the existing world and Commonwealth Games records were as follows.

Results

Heats

Finals

References

Men's 200 metre individual medley SM10
Commonwealth Games